Moro Sumaila (born 20 June 1995) is a Ghanaian footballer who currently plays as a winger for Ghana Premier League side Cape Coast Ebusua Dwarfs.

Career 
Sumaila started his career with Cape Coast Ebusua Dwarfs in June 2019. He made his debut during the truncated 2019–20 season. He played his first match on 29 December 2019 in 3–1 home loss to Medeama. He started the match and played 79 minutes of the match before being taken off for Jacob Ampratwum. On 11 March 2020, he provided a brace of assists to Seidu Abubakari to score a second half brace and help Dwarfs to a 2–1 victory over King Faisal Babes. On 15 March 2020, he scored his debut goal after scoring the equalizer in a 1–1 draw against Techiman Eleven Wonders after Salifu Ibrahim had put XI Wonders ahead. At the time the league was cancelled due to the COVID-19 pandemic in Ghana, he had played 7 matches and scored a goal. He was named on the club's squad list for the 2020–21 season with the league set to restart in November 2020.

On 16 January 2021, he scored his first goal of the season, by scoring an 83rd minute winning goal in a 2–1 victory over Liberty Professionals, to help them get their first away win of the season. On 31 January, in a match against Aduana Stars, Sumaila scored an 82nd-minute equalizer to help Dwarfs to a 2–2 draw. However, he did not finish the came as he was sent off 89th minute of the game after picking up two yellow cards, one early on in the 50th minute. After scoring another one goal each against Inter Allies and Hearts of Oak, to bring his tally between January and February to 4 goals in 7 matches. In May 2021, he scored another equalizer to help Dwarfs to 1–1 draw against Dreams.

Sumaila scored his first GPL hat-trick on 28 June 2021, scoring in the 12th, 49th minute and 81st minutes, in a 4–1 away win against Karela United. This made him the third player to score a hat-trick that season, after Joseph Esso and Kwame Peprah. He was adjudged the man of the match at the end of the match. Even though the club got relegated at the end of the season based on head-to-head disadvantage against Elmina Sharks, he ended the season as one of the club's top performers, as the club's top scorer with 8 goals in 30 matches.

References

External links 

 

Living people
1995 births
Association football midfielders
Ghanaian footballers
Ebusua Dwarfs players
Ghana Premier League players